"The Black Pits of Luna" is a science fiction short story by American writer Robert A. Heinlein, about a Boy Scout on a trip to the Moon and his novel way of finding his lost brother. Included as part of his Future History, it originally appeared in The Saturday Evening Post, January 10, 1948, and was collected in The Green Hills of Earth (and subsequently The Past Through Tomorrow).

See also
"Searchlight (short story)"

References

External links
 

1948 short stories
Short stories by Robert A. Heinlein
Science fiction short stories
Short stories set on the Moon
Scouting in popular culture
Works originally published in The Saturday Evening Post